De Nova is the second album by Chicago-based rock band The Redwalls, released in the United States on June 21, 2005 through Capitol Records. Produced by Rob Schnapf (Elliott Smith, The Vines), De Nova was the first album the band released on Capitol since initially signing with the label in 2003. "It's Alright" was featured on an episode of the HBO Original Series Entourage.

Track listing

Chart positions

Personnel 

Justin Baren – Group Member
Logan Baren – Group Member
Ben Greeno – Group Member
Andrew Langer – Group Member
Jeff Turmes – Saxophones
Doug Boehm – Engineer
Ted Jensen – Mastering
Eric Roinestad – Art Direction, Design
Rob Schnapf – Producer, Mixing, Musician
Anita Kornick – A&R
Julian Raymond – A&R
Daniel Gabbay – Photography
Adam Roehlke – Photography
Jonathan "JP" Parker – Photography
The Cobrasnake – Photography
Mary Fagot – Photography, Creative Director

References

The Redwalls albums
2005 albums
Capitol Records albums
Albums produced by Rob Schnapf